Erdem Can (born 3 November 1980) is a Turkish professional basketball coach, who is currently the head coach for Türk Telekom of the Turkish Basketbol Süper Ligi (BSL).

Early life 
Can played basketball for youth system teams of Sümerbank (1993–1996) and Mülkiyespor (1996–1998).

Can earned his master’s degree in political science and public administration at the Ankara University Faculty of Political Science in 2003.

Coaching career

Fenerbahçe (2012–2021)

An assistant coach, Can worked for Fenerbahçe between 2012 and 2021. Under head coach Željko Obradović, he helped the team to four Turkish League Championships, three Turkish Cups, five EuroLeague Final Fours, three EuroLeague Finals, and a EuroLeague title in the 2016–17 season. Also, he was an assistant coach during the 2020–21 Fenerbahçe season under head coach Igor Kokoškov.

Can was an assistant coach for the Turkish national team at the EuroBasket 2017.

Utah Jazz (2021–2022)
On 20 August 2021, Can was named an assistant coach for Utah Jazz under Quin Snyder. Prior to his hire, he had assisted the Utah Jazz's summer league coaching staff five times in Salt Lake City and Las Vegas.

Türk Telekom (2022–present)
On June 10, 2022, he has signed and became the head coach for Türk Telekom of the Turkish Basketbol Süper Ligi (BSL).

Career achievements  
As assistant coach
 EuroLeague champion: 1 (with Fenerbahçe: 2016–17) 
 Turkish League champion: 4 (with Fenerbahçe: 2013–14, 2015–16, 2016–17, 2017–18)
 Turkish Cup winner: 3 (with Fenerbahçe: 2016, 2019, 2020)
 Turkish Super Cup winner: 3 (with Fenerbahçe: 2013, 2016, 2017)

See also 

 List of foreign NBA coaches

References

External links
 Erdem Can at eurobasket.com
  Erdem Can at fibaeurope.com

1980 births
Living people
Ankara University Faculty of Political Sciences alumni
Sportspeople from Ankara
Turkish basketball coaches
Turkish expatriate basketball people in the United States
Utah Jazz assistant coaches